Tanwood is a hamlet in the English county of Worcestershire.

It lies about one mile northeast of the village of Chaddesley Corbett and forms part of the district of Wyre Forest.

Hamlets in Worcestershire